The South Asian Games is a biennial multi-sport event which began in 1984. Athletics has been one of the sports held at the Games since the inaugural edition. Records set by athletes who are representing one of the South Asian Sports Council's member states.

Men's records

Women's records

References

External links
 South Asian Games Records

Records
South Asian Games
Athletics
South Asian Games